Kevin Roberto Garcia-Lopez (born August 29, 1992) is an American soccer player who plays as a defender for California United Strikers

Club career

Las Vegas Lights FC
On January 9, 2019, Garcia-Lopez was announced as a new addition to the Las Vegas Lights' roster ahead of the teams 2019 season. This was his first professional soccer contract. He appeared in 26 games for the Lights and started in each one.

California United Strikers FC
In February 2020, Garcia-Lopez was signed by National Independent Soccer Association side California United Strikers FC.

References

External links
UC Santa Barbara Athletics bio

1992 births
Living people
American soccer players
Association football defenders
Las Vegas Lights FC players
California United Strikers FC players
Soccer players from Torrance, California
UC Santa Barbara Gauchos men's soccer players
USL Championship players
National Independent Soccer Association players